The Onondaga County Savings Bank was chartered in 1855 in Syracuse, New York. It was a franchise ahead of its time and had four separate branches by the late 19th century. The Onondaga County Savings Bank Building was constructed in 1897 adjacent to the Erie Canal in Clinton Square.

In 1968, the bank shortened its name to Onondaga Savings Bank and in 1987 it changed again to OnBank.

References

Bank buildings on the National Register of Historic Places in New York (state)
Buildings and structures in Syracuse, New York
Historic district contributing properties in New York (state)
National Register of Historic Places in Syracuse, New York